Problepsis conjunctiva is a moth of the  family Geometridae. It is found in India (Sikkim), China (Hainan) and Taiwan.

The wingspan is 28–37 mm.

Subspecies
Problepsis conjunctiva conjunctiva (India: Sikkim)
Problepsis conjunctiva subjunctiva Warren, 1893 (China: Hainan)

References

Moths described in 1917
Scopulini
Moths of Asia
Moths of Taiwan